National Highway 24 (NH 24) is a primary national highway in India, running in a north-south direction. This highway runs entirely in the state of Uttar Pradesh. This highway was created by renumbering former NH29 and NH97 as per new numbering system of national highways.

Route 
NH24 connects Sonauli (Indo/Nepal border), Nautanwa, Kolhui, Pharenda, Rawatganj, Gorakhpur, Bhaurapur, Kauriram, Barhalganj, Doharighat, Ghosi, Mau, Mardah, Ghazipur, Zamania and Saiyad Raja in the state of Uttar Pradesh.

Junctions  
 
  Siddhartha Highway - Terminal Junction at India/Nepal border.
  near Pharenda (Anandnagar)
  near Campierganj
  near Gorakhpur
  near Gorakhpur
  near Barhalganj
  near Dohrighat
  near Mau
  near Ghazipur
  near Medinipur
  Terminal near Saiyad Raja.

See also 
 List of National Highways in India
 List of National Highways in India by state

References

External links 

 NH 24 on OpenStreetMap

National highways in India
National Highways in Uttar Pradesh